The 2009 Hong Kong Cricket Sixes was the fifteenth contesting of the tournament, taking place at Kowloon Cricket Club, Hong Kong.  Eight nations competed in twenty-two matches over two days, 31 October – 1 November 2009.  South Africa won the tournament, narrowly defeating hosts Hong Kong in the final, after Farhaan Behardien hit the required six off the last ball of the match.

Despite losing in the final, Hong Kong's Irfan Ahmed was awarded the Ben Hollioake Trophy, given to the player of the tournament. He played in all seven of Hong Kong's matches, and finished with 163 runs, which was bettered only by England's Peter Trego. He also claimed three wickets in the tournament, at an economy of 13.63 runs per over, ranking him fifth of all bowlers for economy. South Africa's David Wiese claimed the most wickets, taking seven in his seven matches. Peter Trego topped the batting charts with 184 runs, boosted by a top-score of 65* after returning to bat in England's third match after they'd lost four wickets. His 21 sixes were also the most scored by a batsman in the tournament.

Squads

Rules and regulations
All standard laws of the game as laid down by the MCC applied with the following significant differences:

General
Games are played between two teams of six players, and consist of five overs of six balls, with the exception of the final which consists of five overs of eight balls.  Each member of the fielding side, with the exception of the wicket-keeper shall bowl one over.  Wides and no-balls count as two runs to the batting side, plus an extra ball.

Last man stands
If five wickets fall (not including batsmen retiring not out) before the allocated overs have been completed, the remaining batsman continues, with the last batsman out remaining as a runner.  The not out batsman shall always face strike, and shall be declared out if his partner is declared out.

Batsman retire
A batsman must retire not out on reaching 31 runs, but not before.  He may complete all runs scored on the ball on which he reaches his 31, and retire immediately after.  If one of the last pair of batsmen is out, any remaining not out batsman may resume his innings.  In the case where there is more than one, they must return in the order they retired.

Group stage

Northern Hemisphere

Southern Hemisphere

Cup round-robin stage

Plate

Semi-finals

Final

Cup Final

Final standings

Records

Most runs

Most wickets

Notes
 ** is used to signify that a batsman was forced to retire not out as his personal score was 31 or more.

References

Hong Kong Cricket Sixes
Hong Kong Cricket Sixes